Saytarkent is a rural locality (a selo) in Ullugatagsky Selsoviet, Suleyman-Stalsky District, Republic of Dagestan, Russia. The population was 465 as of 2010. There are 4 streets.

Geography 
Saytarkent is located 13 km south of Kasumkent (the district's administrative centre) by road. Ptikent is the nearest rural locality.

References 

Rural localities in Suleyman-Stalsky District